Swift Dam or Swift No. 1 is an earth-type hydroelectric dam on the Lewis River, in the U.S. state of Washington. Completed  in 1958, it is located in Skamania County and its reservoir is called Swift Reservoir.

See also

List of dams in the Columbia River watershed
List of lakes in Washington (state)

References

Dams in Washington (state)
Hydroelectric power plants in Washington (state)
PacifiCorp dams
Buildings and structures in Skamania County, Washington
Dams completed in 1958
Energy infrastructure completed in 1958
Gifford Pinchot National Forest
Dams on the Lewis River (Washington)